Myszki may refer to the following places:
Myszki, Greater Poland Voivodeship (west-central Poland)
Myszki, Masovian Voivodeship (east-central Poland)
Myszki, Warmian-Masurian Voivodeship (north Poland)